The East Germany national under-18 ice hockey team was the men's national under-18 ice hockey team in East Germany. It ceased to exist after the Reunification of Germany in 1990.

The team made two appearances at the IIHF European Junior Championships, finishing 6th in 1968 and winning Group C in 1990. They also participated at the unofficial 1967 European U19 Championship.

International competitions

IIHF European U18/U19 Championships
 

1967 (unofficial): 3rd in Group B
1968: 6th place
1969-1989: did not participate
1990: 1st in Group C

References

National under-18 ice hockey teams
Under